The following is a timeline of the history of the city of Cheyenne, Wyoming, USA.

19th century
 1867
 July 4: Union Pacific Railroad sets up mountain region headquarters at Crow Creek Crossing, later known as Cheyenne.
 August 10: H. M. Hook elected mayor.
 Fort D.A. Russell established nearby.
 Cheyenne Leader newspaper begins publication.
 November 13: Railroad begins operating.
 1868 - City charter granted by Dakota Territory legislature.
 1869
 May 25: Wyoming Territory court in session.
 Wyoming Tribune newspaper begins publication.
 Fire.
 Eagle Hotel in business.
 Population: 2,305.
 1870
 On September 14, 1870, the signature of General Grenville M. Dodge on the Original City Plat of Cheyenne, Wyoming Territory, was notarized.
 On September 21, 1870, at 10:30 AM, the Cheyenne Original City Plat was recorded by Laramie County Clerk.
 1872
 Stock Association of Laramie County organized.
 Court House built.
 1873 - November: Legislative Assembly of Wyoming Territory in session.
 1874 - City Hall built.
 1876
 Cheyenne and Black Hills Stage begins operating.
 Population: 3,250 (estimate).
 1881 - Joseph M. Carey becomes mayor.
 1882 - Opera House built.
 1884 - William Sturgis House (residence) built.
 1885 - Francis E. Warren becomes mayor.
 1886
 Library opens on Carey Avenue.
 St. Mark's Episcopal Church built.
 Cheyenne and Northern Railway operates from 1886 to 1890.
 1887 - Cheyenne Depot built.
 1888 - Nagle Warren Mansion (residence) built.
 1890
 July 10: Cheyenne becomes capital of new state of Wyoming.
 Wyoming State Capitol building and First United Methodist Church constructed.
 Population: 11,690.
 1892 - Tivoli Building constructed.
 1895 - Wyoming State Museum established.
 1896 - Cheyenne Business College established.
 1897 - Cheyenne Frontier Days begin.
 1900 - Population: 14,087.

20th century

 1902 - Laramie County Library opens.
 1903 - May: Theodore Roosevelt visits Cheyenne.
 1904 - Wyoming Governor's Mansion built.
 1905 - Population: 13,656.
 1908 - Atlas Theatre opens.
 1909 - St. Mary's Catholic Cathedral consecrated.
 1910 - Population: 11,320.
 1914 - City adopts commissioner form of government.
 1920 - Lincoln Highway surfaced near Cheyenne.
 1928 - High Plains Horticulture Research Station established.
 1929 - Boeing Terminal built at Cheyenne Airport.
 1930 - Cheyenne Little Theatre Players founded.
 1937 - Wyoming Governmental Research Association headquartered in Cheyenne.
 late 1940's - Union Pacific Big Boy an articulated 4-8-8-4 steam locomotive, was assigned to Cheyenne, Wyoming, where they hauled freight over Sherman Hill to Laramie, Wyoming.
 1952 - Cheyenne Genealogy Society formed.
 1960 - Cheyenne East High School established.
 1968 - Laramie County Community College established.
 1972 - City government changes to mayor-council format.
 1976 - New Wyoming Governor's Mansion built.
 1977 - Cheyenne Community Solar Greenhouse and Historic Governor's Mansion museum opens.
 1978 - Cheyenne Frontier Days Old West Museum founded.
 1979 - July 16: Tornado.
 1980 - Population: 47,283.
 1981 - Frontier Mall in business.
 1993 - Cheyenne Depot Museum founded.
 1999 - City website online (approximate date).
 2000 - Taco John's Events Center opens.

21st century

 2009
 Rick Kaysen becomes mayor.
 Cheyenne South High School opens.
 2010
 Cheyenne Capidolls roller derby league formed.
 Population: 59,466.
 2011 - Cheyenne Warriors football team and Arts Alliance of Cheyenne formed.
 2012 - National Center for Atmospheric Research-Wyoming Supercomputing Center begins operating.
 2013 - Arts Cheyenne organized (approximate date).

See also
 National Register of Historic Places listings in Laramie County, Wyoming

References

Bibliography

 
 
 
 
 
 
 
  (fulltext via Open Library)

External links

 Wyoming State Newspaper Project. Items related to Cheyenne
 Wyoming State Archives in Cheyenne
 Items related to Cheyenne, various dates (via Digital Public Library of America).
 Materials related to Cheyenne, various dates (via U.S. Library of Congress).
 Materials related to Cheyenne, various dates (via U.S. Library of Congress, Prints and Photos Division)

Cheyenne
Cheyenne
Years in Wyoming
History of Cheyenne, Wyoming